Witków may refer to:

Witków, Legnica County in Lower Silesian Voivodeship (south-west Poland)
Witków, Świdnica County in Lower Silesian Voivodeship (south-west Poland)
Witków, Wałbrzych County in Lower Silesian Voivodeship (south-west Poland)
Witków, Lublin Voivodeship (east Poland)
Witków, Lubusz Voivodeship (west Poland)
Witków, Pomeranian Voivodeship (north Poland)